Elisabeth Young-Bruehl (born Elisabeth Bulkley Young; March 3, 1946 – December 1, 2011) was an American academic and psychotherapist, who from 2007 until her death resided in Toronto, Ontario, Canada. She published a wide range of books, most notably biographies of Hannah Arendt and Anna Freud. Her 1982 biography of Hannah Arendt won the first Harcourt Award while The Anatomy of Prejudices won the Association of American Publishers' prize for Best Book in Psychology in 1996. She was a member of the Toronto Psychoanalytic Society and co-founder of Caversham Productions, a company that makes psychoanalytic educational materials.

Life
Young-Bruehl's family on her mother's side ran a dairy farm on land near the head of Chesapeake Bay, and were active in local Maryland politics.  Her mother's father and grandfather (a newspaper editor) had been amateur scholars with a large private library. Her maternal grandmother was a Mayflower descendant, part of the Hooker and Bulkley families of Connecticut. Her father's family were Virginians, several trained in Theology at the College of William & Mary in Williamsburg, Virginia, where the family home,  the Maupin-Dixon House, is located. She grew up in Maryland and Delaware, where her father worked as a teaching golf pro.

Then she attended Sarah Lawrence College, where she studied poetry writing with Muriel Rukeyser.  Young-Bruehl left college for the New York City counterculture of the mid-1960s, but then completed her undergraduate studies at The New School (then the "New School for Social Research"). There she met and married Robert Bruehl, whom she later divorced. Just as the political theorist Hannah Arendt was joining the Graduate Faculty of the New School, Young-Bruehl enrolled as a Ph.D candidate in Philosophy.  Arendt became Young-Bruehl's mentor and dissertation advisor. After earning her Ph.D. in 1974, Young-Bruehl took a faculty appointment the following year teaching Philosophy in the College of Letters, Wesleyan University in Connecticut.

The next year, after Hannah Arendt died at 69, several of Arendt's émigré friends approached Young-Bruehl to take on the task of writing Arendt's biography. The resulting book, published in 1982, is still the standard work on Hannah Arendt's life. It has been translated into many languages, including recently (2010) Hebrew, and a second English edition came out in 2004.

Young-Bruehl's work on the Arendt biography gave her an increasingly strong interest in psychoanalysis. In 1983, she enrolled for clinical psychoanalytic training in New Haven, Connecticut. At New Haven's Child Study Center, she met several of Anna Freud's American colleagues, and was invited to become Anna Freud's biographer, leading to the 1988 book Anna Freud: A Biography. This had a second edition in 2008, with a new Preface.

In 1991 Young-Bruehl left Wesleyan and moved to Philadelphia, where she taught part-time at Haverford College and continued her psychoanalytic training at the Philadelphia Association for Psychoanalysis, from which she graduated in 1999. She started a private practice as a therapist, first in Philadelphia and later in New York City.  Throughout this time, she continued to publish books, including collections of her essays and the award-winning "The Anatomy of Prejudices". The book on prejudices was followed in 2012 by Childism: Confronting Prejudice Against Children, published posthumously by Yale University Press.

Young-Bruehl died of a pulmonary embolism on December 1, 2011.  She was 65.

Works 

 Conor Cruise O'Brien: An Appraisal (co-author: Joanne L. Henderson. Proscenium Press, 1974)
 Freedom and Karl Jasper's Philosophy (Yale University Press, 1981)
 Hannah Arendt: For Love of the World (Yale University Press 1982, ; Second Edition Yale University Press, 2004)
 Vigil (novel, Louisiana State University Press, 1983)
 Anna Freud: A Biography (Summit Books, New York, 1988)
 Mind and the Body Politic (Routledge, Independence, Kentucky, 1989)
 Foreword to Between Hell and Reason: Essays From the Resistance Newspaper "Combat", 1944-1947 (Wesleyan University Press, 1991)
 Creative Characters, (Routledge, 1991)
 Freud on Women: A Reader (editor) (Norton, 1992)
 Global Cultures: a Transnational Short Fiction Reader (editor, Wesleyan University Press, 1994)
 The Anatomy of Prejudices (Harvard University Press, 1996),
 Foreword to 1997 re-issue of David Stafford-Clark's 1965 book, What Freud Really Said: An Introduction to His Life and Thought (Schocken Books, 1997)
 Subject to Biography: Psychoanalysis, Feminism, and Writing Women's Lives (Harvard Univ Press, 1999),
 Cherishment: a Psychology of the Heart  (co-author: Faith Bethelard. Free Press, 2000)
 Where Do We Fall When We Fall in Love? (essays, Other Press (NY), 2003)
 Why Arendt Matters (Yale University Press, 2006)
 Childism: Confronting Prejudice Against Children (Yale University Press, 2012)

Notes

External links

References
   (biographical notes). Originally part of the publicity for Cherishment.
 Caversham Productions Biographies – Retrieved January 17, 2011.
 Elisabeth Young-Bruehl's blog containing psychoanalytic and political essays

1946 births
2011 deaths
20th-century American novelists
American women novelists
American women poets
Columbia University faculty
Psychology writers
American psychotherapists
The New School alumni
The New School faculty
Wesleyan University faculty
Sarah Lawrence College alumni
Deaths from pulmonary embolism
20th-century American women writers
20th-century American poets
20th-century American biographers
American women biographers
Novelists from New York (state)
Novelists from Connecticut
Historians from New York (state)
21st-century American women